Frances Reynolds (6 June 1729 – 1 November 1807 London) was a British artist, and the youngest sister of Sir Joshua Reynolds.

Life
She was born in 1729 and later kept Sir Joshua's house for many years after he came to London, and employed herself in miniature and other painting. But when her nieces, the Misses Palmer, were old enough to take her place, she (some point before 15 February 1779) left his house forever. The separation from her brother caused her lasting regret.

Her brother made her an allowance, and she went first to Devon; and then, in 1768, to stay with a Miss Flint in Paris, where Reynolds visited her. She later lived as a lodger of Dr. John Hoole, whose portrait, prefixed to the first edition of his translation of Ariosto, was painted by her.

On her brother's death in 1792 she took a large house in Queen's Square, Westminster, where she exhibited her own works, and where she died, unmarried, on 1 November 1807.

Their other siblings included Mary Palmer and Elizabeth Johnson.

Works
Of her work, Sir Joshua, speaking of the copies which she made of his pictures, says " "they make other people laugh and me cry;" but a letter of James Northcote's says that "she paints very fine, both history and portrait." Samuel Johnson, who was very fond of her, and visited her in Dover Street, where she was living by herself in 1780, was not pleased with the portrait she made of himself in 1783, and called it his "grimly ghost."

Of her literary work Johnson held a higher opinion, and he was complimentary about her ‘Essay on Taste’ (privately printed, 1784). All his letters to her and about her show interest in his ‘Renny dear.’ He left her a book as a legacy. She printed a ‘Melancholy Tale’ in verse in 1790.

References

Attribution

External links
 
 
 Frances Reynolds papers at Houghton Library, Harvard University

1729 births
1807 deaths
18th-century English painters
18th-century English women artists
English women painters
Sibling artists